Robert Baldry (born 30 November 1950) is an Australian former cricketer. He played 26 first-class cricket matches for Victoria between 1972 and 1977.

Baldry played 152 games for Collingwood Cricket Club in the Melbourne's District Cricket Competition between 1967/68 and 1980/81.

See also
 List of Victoria first-class cricketers

References

External links
 

1950 births
Living people
Australian cricketers
Victoria cricketers
Cricketers from Melbourne